The Cellar may refer to:

The Cellar (novel), a 1980 horror novel by Richard Laymon
The Cellar (Macy's), a brand name used by Macy's
The Cellar (teen dance club), 1960s-70s, Arlington Heights, Illinois
The Cellar (1989 film), a horror film directed by Kevin S. Tenney
10 Cloverfield Lane, a 2016 thriller film directed by Dan Trachtenburg, previously known as The Cellar
The Cellar (2022 film), a supernatural horror film